The Crespo Municipality is one of the nine municipalities (municipios) that makes up the Venezuelan state of Lara and, according to a 2007 population estimate by the National Institute of Statistics of Venezuela, the municipality has a population of 49,813.  The town of Duaca is the shire town of the Crespo Municipality.

Demographics
The Crespo Municipality, according to a 2011 population census by the National Institute of Statistics of Venezuela, has a population of 49,958 (up from 43,407 in 2000). This amounts to 2.8% of the state's population.

Government
The mayor of the Crespo Municipality is Miguel Valecillos Paul, re-elected on October 31, 2004, with 83% of the vote.  The municipality is divided into two parishes; Fréitez and José María Blanco
.

See also
Duaca
Lara
Municipalities of Venezuela

References

External links
crespo-lara.gob.ve 

Municipalities of Lara (state)